Dr. Antonín Benjamin Svojsík (September 5, 1876–September 17, 1938) was the founder of the Czechoslovak Scouting organization Junák.

Dr. Svojsík served on the World Scout Committee of the World Organization of the Scout Movement from its creation in 1922 until 1933.

When J. S. Wilson visited Czechoslovakia for two weeks in April and May 1947, he laid a wreath on the tomb of Dr. Svojsík.

References

 Scouting Round the World, John S. Wilson, first edition, Blandford Press 1959 p. 46 88 162

1876 births
1938 deaths
People from Prague
People from the Kingdom of Bohemia
World Scout Committee members
Scouting pioneers
Scouting and Guiding in the Czech Republic